Appleton is an unincorporated community in Allendale County, in the U.S. state of South Carolina.

History
Appleton was founded in 1872 when the railroad was extended to that point, and was named after a railroad agent. A post office called Appleton was established in 1872, and remained in operation until 1960.

In 1925, Appleton had 234 inhabitants.

References

Unincorporated communities in South Carolina
Unincorporated communities in Allendale County, South Carolina
Populated places established in 1872
1872 establishments in South Carolina